Tiger Cruise is a Disney Channel Original Movie that debuted on Disney Channel in the United States on August 6, 2004. It stars Hayden Panettiere and Bill Pullman. The film's fictional events are intertwined with the real-life events of the September 11 attacks in which USS Constellation was, as depicted, actually returning from her 2001 Western Pacific deployment with "tigers" on board when the September 11 terrorist attacks occurred.

Plot 
Teenager Maddie Dolan hails from San Diego. She looks forward to the day her father Gary, a Commander in the U.S. Navy, retires from military service so that he can share Maddie's life at home with her sister Kiley and their mother Kate. Maddie's dad invites her to participate in Operation Tiger, a week-long cruise for military families and their friends aboard the aircraft carrier USS Constellation. She agrees and soon hits it off with fellow teens Anthony and Tina. Tina is fascinated by the military, her elder sister Grace being a United States Naval Aviator. Anthony, an aspiring drummer from New York City, would rather have nothing to do with the military, although his elder brother Kenny is a sailor. Maddie also bonds with preteen Joey, whose mom is a "Squid" (Naval slang for sailor) aboard the Constellation.

On September 10, 2001 (one day into the cruise), the "Tigers" are excited about the day's upcoming air show. Tina hopes to take pictures from the flight deck of Grace's jet taking off. However, the flight deck is a restricted area due to safety regulations; non-military personnel must watch the airshow from "Vulture's Row". Tina, Maddie and Anthony disguise themselves as members of the deck crew so that Tina can get the pictures she wants. The threesome are recognized by the instructor and brought to Captain Anderson's office. The Captain reprimands the teenagers for their reckless actions, warning them that violation of any further regulations will get all three confined to their quarters until the carrier docks. After the teens retire, Anderson admits to their families that—more than anything else—his threats were intended to scare the threesome into line and keep them there.

Gary, Grace, and Kenny express their disappointment over what happened during the air show. Commander Dolan tells Maddie about another, tragic incident when a crew member was killed landing a jet during practice maneuvers. Maddie tearfully divulges her true reason for accepting his invitation: she dislikes the negative connotations that come with being a military brat. Maddie recalls how she and Kiley got jumped on their first day at school and suspended for fighting. Gary agrees to come home after the voyage.

On September 11, 2001, the crew and passengers learn of the terrorist attacks on the World Trade Center and The Pentagon. With the Constellation abruptly going on full alert, Tina finally realizes the truth behind her sister's assertions regarding the less-glamorous side of military life. Anthony fears for the safety of people he knew who had jobs in the Twin Towers. Maddie experiences her father's honor, courage, and commitment to his family and also his will to make sacrifices for their country. Although upset that her dad is still needed in the military, she and her fellow Tigers express their pride and support by unfurling a giant American flag on the Constellation's flight deck. Maddie, having concluded that being a "brat" isn't so bad after all, tells her father and his crew-mates to keep doing what they do.

Cast
 Hayden Panettiere as Madeline "Maddie" Dolan
 Bill Pullman as Commander Gary Dolan
 Bianca Collins as Tina
 Nathaniel Lee, Jr. as Anthony
 Mercedes Colon as Grace
 Mehcad Brooks as Kenny
 Jansen Panettiere as Joey
 Lisa Dean Ryan as Diane
 Troy Evans as Chuck Horner
 Ty O'Neal as Danny Horner
 Chris Ellis as Captain Anderson
 Gary Weeks as Lieutenant Tom Hillman
 Barbara Niven as Kate Dolan
 Jennette McCurdy as Kiley Dolan
 E. Matthew Buckley as Pilot Brown
 Mark Christopher Lawrence as Pop

Production
It was also filmed on location in San Diego.

Panettiere sings the theme song for the film, "My Hero Is You".

Broadcast and release
Tiger Cruise had its broadcast premiere on Disney Channel on August 6, 2004, but the film had its premiere in Los Angeles with many stars of other Disney Channel Original Movies in attendance.

Reception
Many critics noted that the film departed from the usual Disney Channel Original Movie formula. Laura Fries of Variety noted that the film "...carries many Disney hallmarks — a burgeoning teen-queen star, a catchy theme song and predictable subplots, but marks a departure from the net’s usual fairytale formula" and adds that writers "Anna Sandor and Bruce Graham deserve kudos for filtering a tough story through the eyes of kids without diluting the message... [The film] never feels exploitative or opportunistic." Mike McDaniel of The Houston Chronicle states that "The sobering events of 9/11 give this otherwise typical Disney movie unusual gravity." Barbara Vancheri of Pittsburgh Post-Gazette describes Tiger Cruise as "a veritable recruitment film with a predictable conclusion but it's a pretty good little movie with solid leading performances", adding "the movie comes down on the side of maturity, sacrifice and duty, and it's hard to argue with that." However, Anita Gates of The New York Times was more critical, describing the film as "a worthy two-hour movie", but notes that Tiger Cruise "feels polarizing rather than patriotic".

The film drew 3.8 million viewers, scoring a 2.8 household rating, and attracting 1.4 million viewers among tweens 9–14. Three encore telecast averaged 2.5 million viewers.

Tiger Cruise holds a 67% rating on Rotten Tomatoes based on six reviews.

References

External links

 

2004 television films
2004 films
2000s teen drama films
2000s English-language films
American aviation films
American children's drama films
American teen drama films
Disney Channel Original Movie films
Films based on the September 11 attacks
Films about the United States Navy
Seafaring films
Films directed by Duwayne Dunham
Films scored by Steven Bramson
Films set in 2001
Films set in San Diego
Films set on aircraft carriers
2000s American films
Films shot in San Diego